Dr. Mohammad Nidal al-Shaar (born 1956) was  Minister of Economy and Trade for Syria, He left the Syrian Cabinet in June 2012.

Early life, education and career
Al-Shaar was born in the Aleppo in 1956. He earned a B.A. degree from the Faculty of Economics at the University of Aleppo in 1980, and a Ph.D. in economics from the George Washington University.

From 1996 to 2001 he was a professor in the Faculty of Economics at the University of Aleppo.

See also
Cabinet of Syria

References

Minister of Economy and Trade Mohammad Nidal al-Shaar, SANA
Biography of the new Syrian government 2011 - the names and lives of government ministers, Syria FM, 17 April 2011

External links
General Foreign Trade Organization official government website

1956 births
Living people
University of Aleppo alumni
Syrian ministers of economy
Members of the People's Assembly of Syria
Columbian College of Arts and Sciences alumni